Ladislav Rott (5 June 1851 in Prague – 27 May 1906 in Bad Ischl) is one of the sons and eight children of Vincenc Josef Rott, founder of the V. J. Rott company in Prague, Malé náměstí (1840).

V. J. Rott firm business
The brothers Ladislav and Julius Rott (1845–76) took over the family firm in 1872. They began to expand the activities and the company's premises, yet after Julius' early death Ladislav had to continue on his own.

In 1896–97 Ladislav reconstructed a house at no. 142 at Malé náměstí with frescos designed by Mikoláš Aleš and executed by his collaborators Arnošt Hofbauer and Ladislav Novák.

After November 1889 Ladislav's proposal to begin with the planning and construction of Prague Underground, submitted back then hundred years ago, in summer 1898 to the Municipal Council of the Royal Capital City of Prague, was published in the Czech media.

Who had to flee
With his spouse Karolína, born Klecandová, Ladislav had six children, among them Vladimír Jiří Rott, who – as the last member of this known Prague family  active as an entrepreneur in Czechoslovakia – had to flee together with his wife after the communist takeover in February 1948.

Two robberies – 1948 and 1993
The main of the Rott houses – part of the family property claimed by Vladimir J Rott (*1950) to have been "robbed" the second time in 1993 (the first time being after the 1948 Czechoslovak coup d'état), – currently houses a Hard Rock Cafe, before that a.o. a crystal and glass store, the house next to it a hotel.

References

External links
 Company history – an overview, on the vjrott.com pages

19th-century Czech businesspeople
1851 births
1906 deaths
People from Prague